Triethylenemelamine (abbreviated TEM, also called Tretamine) is a drug used in chemotherapy.

It can cause chromatid aberrations in cell models.

See also
 Altretamine

References

Alkylating antineoplastic agents
Triazines
Aziridines